Eretmodini is a tribe of African cichlids.
It contains five species of freshwater fish endemic to Lake Tanganyika. They are small fish with reduced swim bladders that are found near the bottom in the turbulent, coastal surf zone. They are mouthbrooders.

Genera
There are three genera, consisting of five species in the tribe:

Eretmodus Boulenger, 1898
Spathodus Boulenger, 1900
Tanganicodus Poll, 1950

References

External links

 http://ctdbase.org/detail.go?type=taxon&acc=319068

 
Pseudocrenilabrinae

Cichlid fish of Africa